Tim Metcalf is an Australian poet and doctor and has been described as one of Australia's most published doctor-poets.

He lives at Brogo, New South Wales.  He has specialized in remote area medicine since 1984 and has worked in NSW, Victoria, NT and British Columbia.  In  2007 he was awarded the ACT Writing and Publishing Awards poetry award for his anthology of poems Verbal Medicine..  Verbal Medicine is his fourth book.

He was awarded First Prize in the Annual Australian W B Yeats Poetry Prize in 2000 for his entry 'Stages of Dying"

Bibliography
 Corvus, Ginninderra Press Canberra 2001 
 Cut to the Word, Ginninderra Press Canberra 2002 
 Into the No Zone, Ginninderra Press Canberra 2003 
 Verbal Medicine, Ginninderra Press, Canberra, 2006 
 The Solution to Us, Ginninderra Press Adelaide 2008 
 The Effective Butterfly, Ginninderra Press, Port Adelaide 2010 
 Last To Go and Other Poems, Picaro Press, Cardiff NSW 2012
 The Underwritten Plain, Ginninderra Press, Port Adelaide 2018

References

External links
 Tim Metcalf's Home Page contains poems and essays, a full bibliography, readings in medical literature developed for Australian National University Medical School, and the Poets of the Bega Valley Audio Project
 Review of Verbal Medicine by Dr Jim Leavesley, Australian Doctor, 1 Feb 2007

Australian poets
Living people
Year of birth missing (living people)